The Avalanche is a 1919 American silent drama film about gambling directed by George Fitzmaurice who also served as the film's art director. William Scully was the assistant director to Fitzmaurice. The film stars Elsie Ferguson and Warner Oland.

This is the first film that teamed director Fitzmaurice and star Ferguson. Ferguson's gowns were by the designer Callot Soeurs. The film is now considered a lost film.

Cast
 Elsie Ferguson as Chichita, Madame Delano, Helene
 Lumsden Hare as Price Ruyler
 Zeffie Tilbury as Mrs Ruyler
 Fred Esmelton as John Harvey
 William Roselle as Ferdie Derenforth
 Grace Field as Sybil Price
 Warner Oland as Nick Delano
 Harry Wise as
 George Dupre as
 William T. Carleton as *uncredited

See also
List of lost films
The House That Shadows Built, 1931 Paramount promotional film. A possibility that the Elsie Ferguson clip shown is from The Avalanche.

References

External links

The Avalanche at silentera.com

Elsie Ferguson and Lumsden Hare in a still photo from The Avalanche (Univ. of Washington, Sayre Collection)
Lantern slide
kinotv
 still image

1919 films
American silent feature films
Films based on American novels
Films directed by George Fitzmaurice
Lost American films
Paramount Pictures films
1919 drama films
American black-and-white films
Films with screenplays by Ouida Bergère
Silent American drama films
Films based on works by Gertrude Atherton
1919 lost films
Lost drama films
1910s American films
1910s English-language films
English-language drama films